Francisco Daniel Verón (born 28 October 1998) is an Argentine boxer. He competed in the men's middleweight event at the 2020 Summer Olympics.

References

External links

1998 births
Living people
Argentine male boxers
Olympic boxers of Argentina
Boxers at the 2020 Summer Olympics
Place of birth missing (living people)
Pan American Games competitors for Argentina
Boxers at the 2019 Pan American Games